Caloptilia onustella is a moth of the family Gracillariidae. It is known from most of Europe, east to the European part of Russia, Ukraine, Tajikistan and Turkmenistan, as well as Morocco and Turkey.

The larvae feed on Acer species, including Acer campestre, Acer monspessulanum, Acer platanoides and Acer pseudoplatanus. They mine the leaves of their host plant.

Taxonomy
Caloptilia semifascia is often considered to be a form (and thus synonym) of Caloptilia onustella.

References

External links
lepiforum.de

onustella
Moths of Africa
Moths of Asia
Moths of Europe
Moths described in 1813